Sir Philip Greaves, KA (born 19 January 1931) is a Barbadian retired politician who served as the 5th deputy prime minister of Barbados from 1 June 1987 until 6 September 1994 under Lloyd Erskine Sandiford. He later served as acting governor-general of Barbados from 1 July 2017 until 8 January 2018.

References 

1931 births
Barbadian knights
Governors-General of Barbados
Deputy Prime Ministers of Barbados
Knights and Dames of St Andrew (Barbados)
Living people